Georgie Wolton (née Cheesman; February 1934 – 25 August 2021) was a British architect, an original member of the architecture firm Team 4. Critic Jonathan Meades describes her as the "outstanding woman architect of the generation before Zaha [Hadid]".

Biography
Georgie Cheesman trained at the Architectural Association and during her travels to the United States became a fan of the Eames House and Philip Johnson's Glass House.

Together with her younger sister, Wendy, she was a founding member in 1963 of the architectural firm, Team 4, together with Su Brumwell, Norman Foster and Richard Rogers. As the only qualified architect in the group, she effectively enabled the practice to operate. Wolton left the practice after a few months, leaving the others to pass their professional exams.

Wolton went on to practise on her own, her most well known works being Cliff Road Studios in Lower Holloway, London, and The River Cafe garden in Hammersmith. They both date from the late 1960s. Wolton also designed a house in Surrey, with an experimental use of CorTen steel. Meades suggests Wolton was "at the head of the very earliest vanguard of that tendency... that tirelessly reworks the forms of early modernism to the point where they are hardly distinguishable from their models." 

While reviewing the book Guide to the Architecture of London architectural critic Owen Hatherley described Wolton as "an exceptionally rare woman" in a group of architects who "tried to continue some form of modern classicism" during the 1970s and 80s.

Wolton later developed her passion for garden design and was a successful if unqualified landscape architect. She died on 25 August 2021 at the age of 87.

Notable buildings
 Cliff Road Studios, Lower Holloway, London (1968–71)
 Fieldhouse, Crocknorth Farm, Surrey (1969, dismantled c. 1993) – the first house in the UK to use Corten as a primary structure.
 34 Belsize Lane, Hampstead (1976) – architect's own single-storey house.

References

Further reading 
 Darling, Elizabeth, and Lynne Walker, eds. AA Women in Architecture, 1917-2017. London: AA Publications, 2017.
 Lorenz, Clare. Women in Architecture: A Contemporary Perspective. New York: Rizzoli, 1990

External links 
 The Modern House. “ARCHITECT OF THE WEEK: Georgie Wolton Designed First House with CorTen Steel as Primary Structural Material in UK.” Accessed October 22, 2021. https://www.themodernhouse.com/journal/architect-of-the-week-georgie-wolton-designed-first-house-with-corten-steel-as-primary-structural-material-in-uk/.

1937 births
2021 deaths
Architects from London
British women architects
Alumni of the Architectural Association School of Architecture
Modernist architects from the United Kingdom
Place of birth missing
Date of birth missing